Húnavatnshreppur is a former rural municipality located in northwestern Iceland.

History 
The municipality was formed on 1 January 2006 by the union of the former municipalities of Sveinsstaðahreppur , Torfalækjarhreppur , Svínavatnshreppur  and Bólstaðarhlíðarhreppur . In 2022, the municipality merged with Blönduós to form Húnabyggð.

Geography 
Húnavatn is one of the largest Icelandic municipalities. Its southern borders touch the glaciers of Hofsjökull and
Langjökull. In the south are situated also the hot springs in Hveravellir.

References

External links 
Official website

Former municipalities of Iceland
Northwestern Region (Iceland)
States and territories disestablished in 2022